A tulku (also tülku, trulku) is a reincarnate custodian of a specific lineage of teachings in Tibetan Buddhism who is given abhiṣeka and trained from a young age by students of his or her predecessor.

High-profile examples of tulkus include the Dalai Lamas, the Panchen Lamas, the Samding Dorje Phagmos, the Karmapas, Khyentses, the Zhabdrung Rinpoches, and the Kongtruls.

Nomenclature and etymology
The word སྤྲུལ or 'sprul' (Modern Lhasa Tibetan ) was a verb in Old Tibetan literature and was used to describe the བཙན་པོ་ btsanpo ('emperor'/天子) taking a human form on earth. So the sprul idea of taking a corporeal form is a local religious idea alien to Indian Buddhism and other forms of Buddhism (e.g. Theravadin or Zen). Over time, indigenous religious ideas became assimilated by the new Buddhism; e.g. sprul became part of a compound noun, སྤྲུལ་སྐུ་'sprul.sku' ("incarnation body" or 'tülku', and 'btsan', the term for the imperial ruler of the Tibetan Empire, became a kind of mountain deity). The term tülku became associated with the translation of the Sanskrit philosophical term nirmanakaya. According to the philosophical system of trikaya or three bodies of Buddha, nirmanakaya is the Buddha's "body" in the sense of the bodymind (Sanskrit: nāmarūpa). Thus, the person of Siddhartha Gautama, the historical Buddha, is an example of nirmanakaya. In the context of Tibetan Buddhism, tülku means the corporeal existence of enlightened Buddhist masters in general.

In addition to Tibetans and related peoples, Tibetan Buddhism is a traditional religion of the Mongols and their relatives. The Mongolian word for a tülku is qubilγan, though such persons may also be called by the honorific title qutuγtu (Tib: 'phags-pa and Skt: ārya or superior, not to be confused with the historic figure, 'Phags-pa Lama or the script attributed to him, (Phags-pa script), or hutagt in the standard Khalkha dialect. According to the Light of Fearless Indestructible Wisdom by Khenpo Tsewang Dongyal: the term tülku "designates one who is 'noble' (or 'selfless' according to Buddha's usage) and used in Buddhist texts to denote a highly achieved being who has attained the first bhumi, a level of attainment which is truly egoless, or higher."

The Chinese word for tülku is huófó (活佛), which literally means "living Buddha" and is sometimes used to mean tülku, although the Dalai Lama has said that this is a mistranslation, as a tülku isn't necessarily a realized being.

Meaning of "tulku"
Higher Vajrayana practitioner can be reborn as a tülku, who have attained siddhis and mastered  the bardo of dying, bardo of dharmata or bardo of becoming.

Valentine summarizes the shift in meaning of the word tülku: "This term that was originally used to describe the Buddha as a "magical emanation" of enlightenment, is best translated as "incarnation" or "steadfast incarnation" when used in the context of the tulku system to describe patriarchs that reliably return to human form." Also meaning "emanation body".

Finding a successor
Pamela Logan outlines a general approach for finding a successor:

Training
Logan describes the training a tulku undergoes from a young age:

The academic atmosphere is balanced by unconditional love:

History
The tulku system of preserving Dharma lineages did not operate in India. The first tulku line of Tibet is the Karmapas.  After the first Karmapa died in 1193, a lama had recurrent visions of a particular child as his rebirth. This child (born ca. 1205) was recognized as the second Karmapa, thus beginning the Tibetan tulku tradition.

Tulku lineages

Some examples:
Dodrupchen tulkus are the main custodians of Longchen Nyingthig.
Dudjom tulkus are the main custodians of Dudjom Tersar.
Chokling tulkus are the main custodians of Chokling Tersar.
Khyentse tulkus are the main custodians of Jamyang Khyentse Wangpo
Kongtrul tulkus are the main custodians of the Jamgon Kongtrul.
Samding Dorje Phagmo tulkus are the highest female incarnation lineage in Tibet.
Tibetologist Françoise Pommaret estimates there are presently approximately 500 tulku lineages found across Tibet, Bhutan, Northern India, Nepal, Mongolia, and the southwest provinces of China.

Documentaries 
 My Reincarnation
 Tulku
 Unmistaken Child

In fiction 
Tulku by Peter Dickinson, a children's novel about a young English boy who visits Tibet while fleeing the Boxer Rebellion

See also
 Rebirth (Buddhist)
 Incarnation
 Reincarnation Application
 Avatar
 Bodhi
 Kumari — Nepalese Hindu goddess incarnation, similar determination process.
 Namarupa

References

Further reading
 Ray, Reginald A. 1986 "Some aspects of the Tulku tradition in Tibet." in The Tibet Journal 11 (4): 35-69
 Tulku, Thondup (2011).Incarnation:The History and Mysticism of the Tulku Tradition of Tibet Boston.  Shambhala Publications.

External links 

 Reincarnate Lamas: Tulkus and Rinpoches - section from Berzin, Alexander. 2000 The Traditional Meaning of a Spiritual Teacher
 Tulkus: Incarnate Lamas of Tibet - An Interview with His Holiness Sakya Trizin - An excerpt from Testimonies of Tibetan Tulkus; A Research among Reincarnate Buddhist Masters in Exile by Danial Barlocher, Opuscula Tibetana, Rikon-Zurich, August 1982.
 Tulkus: Incarnate Lamas of Tibet 2 - Interview with Sakya Gongma Dagchen Rinpoche - excerpted from Testimonies of Tibetan Tulkus; A Research among Reincarnate Buddhist Masters in Exile by Danial Barlocher, Opuscula Tibetana, Rikon-Zurich, August 1982. (Interview translator: Cyrus Stearns).
 Tulkus : Masters of Reincarnation - focus article at WisdomBooks.com

Tibetan Buddhist titles